The president of Loyola Marymount University (LMU) is the chief administrator of the university. He and the board of trustees, the legal governing body of the university, govern the university. LMU’s president is responsible for articulating and advancing the distinctive nature, culture and heritage of LMU as a Catholic university. Loyola University of Los Angeles was the successor to St. Vincent's College, which had operated since 1865. In 1973, Loyola University officially merged with Marymount College to become Loyola Marymount University. Traditionally the president of LMU was a Jesuit. In 2010, David W. Burcham became the first lay president in the university's history.

President rectors of St. Vincent's College (1865-1911)
Rev. John Asmuth, C.M. (1865)
Rev. James McGill, C.M. (1865–1875)
Rev. Charles J. Bescher, C.M. (1875–1876)
Rev. Miguel Rubio, C.M. (1876–1877)
Rev. Michael V. Richardson, C.M. (1877–1884)
Rev. Aloysius J. Meyer, C.M. (1884–1892)
Rev. J.W. Hickey, C.M. (1892–1895)
Rev. Aloysius J. Meyer, C.M. (1895–1898)
Rev. J.E.A. Linn, C.M. (1898–1901)
Rev. Joseph S. Glass, C.M., D.D (1901–1911)

Presidents of Los Angeles College, St. Vincent's College, Loyola College of Los Angeles, Loyola University of Los Angeles, and Loyola Marymount University (1911-); also presidents of St. Joseph's College (1953-1968) and Marymount College of Los Angeles (1933-1973)

Presidents of Loyola Marymount University
Rev. Richard A. Gleeson, S.J. (1911–1914)
Rev. William J. Deeney, S.J. (1914–1915)
Rev. Frederick A. Ruppert, S.J. (1915–1918)
Rev. Henry Welch, S.J. (1918–1926)
Rev. Joseph A. Sullivan S.J. (1926–1930)
Rev. Zacheus J. Maher, S.J. (1930–1932)
Rev. Hugh C. Duce, S.J. (1932–1937)
Rev. Charles A. McQuillan, S.J. (1937–1942)
Rev. Edward J. Whelan, S.J., Ph.D. (1942–1949)
Rev. Charles S. Cassasa, S.J., Ph.D. (1949–1969)
Rev. Donald P. Merrifield, S.J., Ph.D. (1969–1984)
Rev. James N. Loughran, S.J., Ph.D. (1984–1991)
Rev. Thomas P. O'Malley, S.J., Ph.D. (1991–1999)
Rev. Robert B. Lawton, S.J., Ph.D. (1999–2010)
David W. Burcham, J.D. (October 2010-May 2015)
Timothy Law Snyder, Ph.D. (June 2015 – Present )

Presidents of St. Joseph's College of Orange through 1968
Sister (Mother prior to Vatican II) Mary Felix Montgomery, C.S.J., Ph.D. (1953–1968)

Presidents of Marymount College of Los Angeles through 1973
Mother M. Gertrude Cain, R.S.H.M. (1932–1954, 1956–1960)
Mother M. Aquinas Brown, R.S.H.M. (1954–1956)
Mother M. du Sacre Coeur Smith, R.S.H.M. (1960–1964)
Sister (Mother prior to Vatican II) M. Raymunde McKay, R.S.H.M., D.Phil. (1964–1973)

Loyola Marymount University

Loyola Marymount